A guard ship is a warship assigned as a stationary guard in a port or harbour, as opposed to a coastal patrol boat, which serves its protective role at sea.

Royal Navy

In the Royal Navy of the eighteenth century, peacetime guard ships were usually third-rate or fourth-rate ships of the line. The larger ships in the fleet would be laid up "in ordinary" with skeleton crews, the spars, sails and rigging removed and the decks covered by canvas – the historic equivalent of a reserve fleet. By contrast the guard ships would carry sails and rigging aboard, be defouled below the waterline to increase their speed under sail, and be manned by at least one quarter of their normal crew. 

A port or major waterway may be assigned a single guardship which would also serve as the naval headquarters for the area. Multiple guardships were required at larger ports and Royal Dockyards, with the largest single vessel routinely serving as the Port Admiral's flagship.

If war was declared, or an enemy fleet was sighted, the guard ships could become fully manned and ready for sea in a matter of hours or days, as opposed to the months it could take to recommission a ship "in ordinary". This was of greatest utility to the British prior to the outbreak of the War of Jenkins' Ear against Spain. On 10 July, 1739 King George II authorised preparations for a maritime assault on Spanish colonies. For this purpose, Admiral Edward Vernon was able to assemble a fleet of eight fully armed and provisioned guardships within ten days of the Royal Command. The fleet was so quickly assembled that it reached the Spanish West Indies on 22 October, one day before war was formally declared.

Soviet Navy
In Soviet terminology, a guard ship (сторожевое  корабль, storozhevoj korabl) was a small, general purpose patrol and/or escort vessel. It corresponds to frigate-type ships.

Other uses
A guard-boat is a boat which goes the round of a fleet at anchor to see that due watch is kept at night.

References

Bibliography
 

Ship types